is the Japanese research institute for Antarctica. This agency manages several research bases on Antarctica.

Research centers
The NIPR has several research centers on Antarctica topics. Among others there are meteorological, geological, glacier motion, life science, ice dynamics, etc.

In 1969, the NIPR started collecting meteorites. Their meteorite collection contains almost 17,000 specimens of meteorites — one of the world's largest meteorite collections. The Antarctic meteorite research in the United States is guided by ANSMET.

Antarctic stations 
 Asuka Station
 Dome F
 Mizuho Station
 Showa Station

Planetary science education 
The NIPR Antarctic Meteorite Research Center loans a set of 30 thin sections of various meteorite types for use in education. The Institute prepared 20 sets of this collection. They were used in several European countries as well, including Hungary, Romania, Denmark, and Belgium. The set includes lunar and Martian meteorites.

Asteroid 
Asteroid 7773 Kyokuchiken was named in honor of National Institute of Polar Research (by its shortened Japanese name "Kyokuchiken"). The official naming citation was published by the Minor Planet Center on 25 September 2018.

See also 
 Polar Science
 Glossary of meteoritics

References

Further reading 
 Yanai K., Kojima H., Haramura H. (1995): Catalog of Antarctic Meteorites. NIPR, Tokyo
 William A. Cassidy, Meteorites, Ice and Antarctica, Cambridge University Press (2003),

External links 
 
 
 Future Symposiums at the National Institute of Polar Research
 Antarctic Meteorite Research (journal)
 Memoirs of National Institute of Polar Research

Japanese Antarctic Program
Meteorite organizations
Scientific organizations based in Japan
Antarctic research
1973 establishments in Japan